Piccinni is an Italian surname. Notable people with the surname include:

Niccolò Piccinni (1728–1800), Italian composer
Teatro Piccinni, Italian theater in Bari, Apulia
Louis Alexandre Piccinni (1779–1850), Italian-French composer, grandson of Niccolò

Notable people with the surname Piccini include:
Augusto Piccini (1854-1905), Italian chemist
Isabella Piccini (1664–1732), Italian nun and artist
Achille Piccini (1911–1995), Italian football player
Cristiano Piccini (born 1992), Italian footballer right back with Spanish club Valencia
Teresa Piccini, Mexican ten-pin bowler who competed at the 2006 AMF World Cup
David Piccini, Canadian politician elected to the Legislative Assembly of Ontario in 2018

See also
Picini, tribe of American woodpeckers of the subfamily Picinae
 

Italian-language surnames